The 58th Pennsylvania House of Representatives District is located in southwest Pennsylvania and has been represented by Eric Davanzo since 2020.

District Profile 
The 58th District is located in  Westmoreland County and includes the following areas:

 East Huntingdon Township
 Hunker
 Madison
Mount Pleasant
 Mount Pleasant Township (part)
District Bridgeport 
District Duncan 
District Heccla 
District Spring Garden
 Monessen
 North Belle Vernon
North Huntingdon Township (part)
Ward 03 
Ward 04 (part)
Division 02
 Rostraver Township
Scottdale
 Sewickley Township
 Smithton
 South Huntingdon Township
 Sutersville
 West Newton

Representatives

Recent election results

References

External links
 District map from the United States Census Bureau
 Pennsylvania House Legislative District Maps from the Pennsylvania Redistricting Commission.
 Population Data for District 58 from the Pennsylvania Redistricting Commission.

Government of Westmoreland County, Pennsylvania
58